Al-Asiri is an Arabic toponymic surname (nisba) meaning someone from Asir. Notable people with the surname include:

 Abdullah al-Asiri (1986–2009), a Saudi Arabian al-Qaeda suicide bomber
 Ahmed Al-Assiri (disambiguation), several people
 Ibrahim al-Asiri (born 1981), a Saudi Arabian al-Qaeda bombmaker
 Turki Mash Awi Zayid Al Asiri, a Saudi Arabian who was held in extrajudicial detention at Guantanamo

See also
 Ahmad Asiri (general)

Arabic-language surnames
Toponymic surnames
Nisbas
People from 'Asir Province